Christie Grobbelaar (born 15 June 2000) is a South African rugby union player.

Grobelaar played in the 2022 Commonwealth Games in Birmingham where South Africa won gold.

References 

2000 births
Living people
South African rugby union players
Male rugby sevens players
South Africa international rugby sevens players
Commonwealth Games gold medallists for South Africa
Commonwealth Games medallists in rugby sevens
Rugby sevens players at the 2022 Commonwealth Games
Medallists at the 2022 Commonwealth Games